The 2011 Southland Conference tournament was held at Bearkat Softball Complex on the campus of Sam Houston State University in Huntsville, Texas, from May 12 through 14, 2011. The tournament winner earned the Southland Conference's automatic bid to the 2011 NCAA Division I softball tournament. The championship was syndicated regionally via the Southland Conference Television Network, called by Doug Anderson and Chris Mycoskie. The remainder of the tournament was streamed live on SLC NOW.

Format
The top 6 teams qualified for the Southland softball tournament.  The tournament was played in a double-elimination format including a maximum of 11 games.

Tournament

All times listed are Central Daylight Time.

Line Scores

Day One

Game 1 (UTSA vs McNeese State)

Game 2 (Northwestern State vs Texas State)

Game 3 (McNeese State vs Texas A&M-Corpus Christi)

Game 4 (Texas State vs Texas-Arlington)

Day Two

Game 5 (Texas A&M-Corpus Christi vs Northwestern State)

Game 6 (Texas-Arlington vs UTSA)

Game 7 (McNeese State vs Texas State)

Semi-final Game One (UTSA vs Texas A&M-Corpus Christi)

Day Three

Semi-final Game Two (Texas A&M-Corpus Christi vs McNeese State)

Championship Game (Texas State vs Texas A&M-Corpus Christi)

Awards and honors
Source:  

Tournament MVP: Chandler Hall - Texas State

All-Tournament Teams:

 Jenna Emery - Texas State
 McKensie Baak - Texas State
 Haley Lemons - Texas State
 Anne Marie Taylor - Texas State
 Caley Jeter - Texas A&M-Corpus Christi
 Brittany Tucker - Texas A&M-Corpus Christi 
 Jordan Trujillo - Texas A&M-Corpus Christi
 Molly Guidry - McNeese State
 Stacey Conley - McNeese State
 Kristin Kappler - UTSA

See also
2011 Southland Conference baseball tournament

References

Southland Conference softball tournament
Tournament